In British politics, the Shadow Secretary of State for International Trade is a position within the opposition's shadow cabinet that deals with issues surrounding UK trade negotiations. If elected, the person designated as Shadow Secretary of State may be slated to serve as the new Secretary of State. The incumbent is Nick Thomas-Symonds.

List of Shadow Secretaries of State for International Trade

* Incumbent's length of term last updated: .

References

Official Opposition (United Kingdom)
2016 establishments in the United Kingdom
Trade in the United Kingdom